Ayangudi is a village in the Orathanadu taluk of Thanjavur district, Tamil Nadu, India.

Demographics 

As per the 2001 census, Ayangudi had a total population of 1051 with 530 males and 521 females. The sex ratio was 983. The literacy rate was 53.56.

References 

 

Villages in Thanjavur district